The Western Front electoral district was a constituency created for the 1917 Russian Constituent Assembly election. The electoral district covered the Western Front of the Russian Army.

Results

The result for Muslim Socialists stems from a newspaper report in Russkiye Vedomosti, which had data from 472 out of 602 voting centres.

References

Electoral districts of the Russian Constituent Assembly election, 1917